Group Captain Robert Gordon Yaxley,  (1912 – 3 June 1943) was a Royal Air Force pilot and commander during the Second World War.

Early life
Yaxley was born in Bath, Somerset, the son of Robert and Agnes Elizabeth Yaxley. After attending the Royal Air Force College Cranwell, he commissioned into the Royal Air Force (RAF) on 4 September 1934, with seniority of 28 July 1934.

RAF career
Yaxley served with the No. 2 Armoured Car Company RAF in the 1936–39 Arab revolt in Palestine, and was awarded the Military Cross on 6 November 1936. He had been promoted to the rank of flying officer on 28 January 1936.

At the beginning of the Second World War, Yaxley was serving with No. 252 Squadron RAF and by December 1940 he was the unit's Commanding Officer. On 9 September 1941 he was promoted to wing commander, and took command of No. 272 Squadron RAF, a unit equipped with Bristol Beaufighters. On 17 October 1941 Yaxley was awarded the Distinguished Flying Cross for his command of raiding detachment of fighter aircraft. The citation for the award read:

This was followed by the award of the Distinguished Service Order on 12 December 1941 for his leadership in the Western Desert Campaign. The decoration was the first awarded during the campaign in Libya, and was announced with the following citation:

On 8 July 1942 became Commanding Officer of No. 117 Squadron RAF and under his leadership the squadron began to play a big part in the advance from El Alamein.

On 3 June 1943, Yaxley was killed while piloting a Lockheed Hudson over the Bay of Biscay en route to North Africa. His plane, carrying several passengers including Osgood Hanbury, was shot down by a German Junkers Ju 88 C flown by Lieutenant Hans Olbrecht.

References

1912 births
1943 deaths
Aviators killed by being shot down
Royal Air Force personnel killed in World War II
Royal Air Force pilots of World War II
Companions of the Distinguished Service Order
Graduates of the Royal Air Force College Cranwell
Recipients of the Distinguished Flying Cross (United Kingdom)
Recipients of the Military Cross
Royal Air Force group captains
Victims of aviation accidents or incidents in international waters
Victims of aviation accidents or incidents in 1943
People from Bath, Somerset
Military personnel from Somerset
British military personnel of the 1936–1939 Arab revolt in Palestine